Alkhaly Bangoura (born on 8 January 1996) is a Guinean professional footballer who plays for Algerian Ligue Professionnelle 1 club CS Chebba and the Guinea national football team.

Biography

As a 7-year-old boy, he joined AS Mambo of Kindia, founded by his brother Karim Bangoura, former member of the FC Satellite of Guinea and president of this informal club.

His first touches of the ball impressed more than one, and his talent made him the constant envy of the Guinean Ligue 1 clubs, but he remained in his training club. He was offered to test at the Étoile Sportive du Sahel. Without argument, they signed him in.

Bangoura joined Belgian club UR La Louvière Centre in September 2019.

In December 2020, he moved to CA Bizertin.
In 2022, he joined JS Saoura.
In 2023, he joined CS Chebba.

International goals
Scores and results list Libya's goal tally first.

References

External links
 

1996 births
Living people
Guinean footballers
People from Kindia
Guinean expatriate footballers
Tunisian Ligue Professionnelle 1 players
Saudi Professional League players
Étoile Sportive du Sahel players
Al-Fateh SC players
UR La Louvière Centre players
CA Bizertin players
Guinean expatriate sportspeople in Tunisia
Guinean expatriate sportspeople in Saudi Arabia
Guinean expatriate sportspeople in Belgium
Expatriate footballers in Tunisia
Expatriate footballers in Saudi Arabia
Expatriate footballers in Belgium
Guinea international footballers
Association football forwards